Telluride Bluegrass Festival is an annual music festival in Telluride, Colorado hosted by Planet Bluegrass. Although traditionally the festival focuses on bluegrass music, it often features music from a variety of related genres.

History
The town of Telluride had for many years held a Fourth of July Celebration which had its roots in the early mining days of Telluride, when miners would come from down from the mountains to party and meet up with old friends and meet some women.  The celebration included a fireworks display operated by the local fire department. In 1972, the Telluride Ski Resort opened, and the Town of Telluride expanded the Celebration and advertised it widely in all the surrounding states. Among the new attendees were many who behaved badly, starting fights and causing damage; in response, the Town decided to call off the celebration for 1973.

Scott Brown and a small group of friends convinced the Town to let them organized the 1973 event. The traditional rowdy events were replaced with games in the park for children, a picnic and barbeque.  A stage was built at the far end of Town Park, and after a parade and an afternoon of family fun, the Fall Creek Boys, a local bluegrass band, took the stage to entertain the crowd, followed by the traditional fireworks display.

Encouraged by the success of the 1973 celebration, the first Telluride Bluegrass Festival was organized in Telluride in 1974 by John Herndon, J.B. & Helen Matiotti, Kooster McAllister, and Fred Shellman, who played in the Fall Creek Boys. That year the festival attracted approximately 1000 participants.

The festival became an annual event with attendance capped at 10,000. According to the Library of Congress, the 1980 performance was filmed by Boulder public television and two CDs were made available.

The management of the Bluegrass Festival has changed five times since its inception and is currently managed by Craig Ferguson of Planet Bluegrass.

Although it has been remodeled several times, the stage is still in the original spot, as are the concession stands.

Since at least 2013, capacity has been set at 12,000 per day (48,000 total over the four days of the festival).

In 2013 the festival was impacted by flooding, but returned to its former condition in 2014.

In 2015 the festival's official name is the Telluride Bluegrass and Country Music Festival.

There was no festival in 2020.

Acts
Notable performers have included TENACIOUS D, Greenksky Bluegrass, Tyler Childers, Kacey Musgraves, Johnny Cash, Sam Bush, Elvis Costello, David Byrne, John Fogerty, Chris Daniels & The Kings, Bill Monroe, Nanci Griffith, Mark O'Conner, Dixie Chicks, String Cheese Incident, New Monsoon, Sharon Gilchrist, Railroad Earth, New Grass Revival, Emmylou Harris, Alison Krauss and Union Station, Willie Nelson, Robert Plant,  John Prine, Nickel Creek, Yonder Mountain String Band, Mumford & Sons, Steve Martin and the Steep Canyon Rangers, Peter Rowan, Leftover Salmon, Béla Fleck, Chris Thile, Sara Watkins, Noam Pikelny, Conor Oberst and the Mystic Valley Band, Tim O'Brien, Counting Crows, Mary Chapin Carpenter, Hot Rize, the Del McCoury Band, Brandi Carlile, Powder Ridge, Janelle Monae, Dierks Bentley, Norah Jones, Parker Millsap, and Lyle Lovett, Nanci Griffith, to name a few. The Telluride house band consists of Sam Bush on mandolin, Béla Fleck on banjo, Stuart Duncan on fiddle, Jerry Douglas on Dobro, Edgar Meyer on upright Bass, and Bryan Sutton on guitar.  The 2007 Michelle Shocked gospel CD, ToHeavenURide was recorded live at the Festival.

Band contest
One of the features of the festival is a band contest.  Twelve bands are given slots in the competition.  Judges rate the bands and the top four go to the main stage to compete before the crowd.

Past winners include:
 1985 - Blitz Creek
 1986 - Loose Ties (Runners-up Blue Plate Special)
 1988 - Titan Valley Warheads
 1989 - Powder Ridge
 1990 - Dixie Chicks
 1991 - Meighan Edmonson Mittelmeier Band
 1992 - Sugarbeat
 1993 - String Fever
 1994 - Salt Licks
 1995 - Magraw Gap 
 1996 - Cornbread Sally
 1997 - Ryan Shupe & Rubberband
 1998 - Floodplain Gang
 1999 - Pagosa Hot Strings
 2000 - Clear Blue
 2001 - Bearfoot Bluegrass
 2002 - South Austin Jug Band
 2003 - Hit & Run Bluegrass
 2004 - Burnett Family Bluegrass Band
 2005 - The Badly Bent
 2006 - Greensky Bluegrass
 2007 - Spring Creek Bluegrass Band
 2008 - Blue Canyon Boys
 2009 - The Hillbenders
 2010 - Nora Jane Struthers & the Bootleggers
 2011 - Run Boy Run
 2012 - BlueBilly Grit
 2013 - Front Country
 2014 - Trout Steak Revival
 2015 - The Lil' Smokies
 2016 - Fireball Mail
 2017 - Sugar and the Mint : sugarandthemint.com
 2018 - Wood Belly
 2019 - Bowregard

Book
Dan Sadowsky, Telluride's Emcee for twenty nine years as "Pastor Mustard", has written a book about the festival.  It is entitled Telluride Bluegrass Festival — 40 Years of Festivation.

See also
List of bluegrass music festivals
List of jam band music festivals
Live at the Telluride Bluegrass Festival
Telluride, Colorado
Too Late to Turn Back Now
Leftover Salmon: Thirty Years of Festival! (book)

References

External links

Entry at the Library of Congress
Local newspaper
Telluride Tourism Board Official Site
Telluride Visitor Information
Telluride Lodging

Bluegrass festivals
Music festivals in Colorado
Tourist attractions in San Miguel County, Colorado
Jam band festivals
Music festivals established in 1973
Folk festivals in the United States
Telluride, Colorado